Bart De Strooper is a Belgian molecular biologist and professor at Vlaams Instituut voor Biotechnologie and KU Leuven (Leuven, Belgium) and the UK Dementia Research Institute and University College London, UK. His research interests are in Alzheimer's and other neurodegenerative diseases.

Research and career 
De Strooper obtained an MD at the KU Leuven in 1985 and a PhD in 1992. He did a Postdoc at the EMBL in Heidelberg Germany in 1994. He has been VIB Group leader since 1999, and was Scientific Director, from 2007 to 2016, of the VIB Center for the Biology of Disease at KU Leuven (now VIB-KU Leuven Center for Brain & Disease Research).

In December 2016 he became the director of the UK Dementia Research Institute at University College London. The institute, which has funding of £250m, was announced in May 2016.

His research interest are the secretases, proteases which cleave the amyloid precursor protein (APP), resulting in amyloid peptides. The amyloid peptide is the main constituent of the plaques in the brain of people with Alzheimer's disease.

Awards

Together with Christian Haass he received the Potamkin Prize in 2002.

He received the 2007 Metlife Foundation Award for Medical Research in Alzheimer's Disease along with Robert Vassar and Philip C. Wong

He shared the 2018 Brain Prize with John Hardy, Christian Haass and Michel Goedert.

In November 2018 Expertscape recognized Dr. Strooper as one of the top experts in the world in Alzheimer's disease.

References

Sources
 VIB Department of Molecular and Developmental Genetics
 Bart De Strooper

Belgian molecular biologists
KU Leuven alumni
Academic staff of KU Leuven
Alzheimer's disease researchers
Living people
Year of birth missing (living people)
Belgian neuroscientists